Darren Keet (born 5 August 1989) is a South African soccer player who plays as a goalkeeper. Keet is currently playing for Cape Town City in the PSL.

Club career
Born in Cape Town, Keet was a member of the Vasco Da Gama squad that won promotion to the National First Division in 2008 before joining Premier Soccer League side Bidvest Wits. He made his PSL debut with the Students in 2008 and quickly established himself as the club's number one goalkeeper making 54 league appearances until he signed for the Belgian club KV Kortrijk in June 2011 on a four-year contract.

International career
On 10 September 2013, Keet made his international debut for South Africa in a friendly against Zimbabwe at Orlando Stadium, starting and playing the full 90 minutes in a 2–1 loss. Before the match he told that he wanted "to prove my worth to South Africa".

References

External links
 

1989 births
South African soccer players
Living people
Association football goalkeepers
Soccer players from Cape Town
White South African people
South African expatriate soccer players
Vasco da Gama (South Africa) players
Bidvest Wits F.C. players
K.V. Kortrijk players
Oud-Heverlee Leuven players
Cape Umoya United F.C. players
Cape Town City F.C. (2016) players
South African Premier Division players
Belgian Pro League players
Challenger Pro League players
National First Division players
Expatriate footballers in Belgium
South African expatriate sportspeople in Belgium
South Africa international soccer players
2015 Africa Cup of Nations players
2019 Africa Cup of Nations players